The Substitution of Punishments of Death Act 1841 (4 & 5 Vict. c.56) was an Act of the Parliament of the United Kingdom.

It abolished the death penalty for rape, carnal knowledge of girls under the age of 10, any forgery cases not covered by previous 1832 and 1837 Acts, embezzlement from the Bank of England and South Sea Company, returning to the United Kingdom or its territories before the end of a term of transportation and "Riotous Demolition" of property or churches, replacing it with other penalties such as transportation and imprisonment with or without hard labour.

References
Hansard

United Kingdom Acts of Parliament 1841
Rape in England
Offences against the person
Capital punishment in the United Kingdom
Vandalism
Embezzlement
Forgery